Social Hypocrites is a 1918 silent film drama directed by Albert Capellani and starring May Allison. It was produced and distributed by Metro Pictures.

Cast
May Allison - Leonore Fielding
Marie Wainwright - Maria, Duchess of St. Keverne
Joseph Kilgour - Lord Royle Fitzmaurice
Henry Kolker - Dr. Frank Simpson
Stella Hammerstein - Lady Vanessa Norton
Frank Currier - Col. Francis Fielding
Ethel Winthrop - Lady Felicia Mountstephen
Maggie Breyer - Fluffy
Stephen Grattan - Father Gilbert Grandon

Preservation status
This is a surviving film with copies in the Cinema Museum, London and Archives Du Film Du CNC (Bois d'Arcy).

References

External links
 Social Hypocrites at IMDb.com

1918 films
American silent feature films
Metro Pictures films
Films directed by Albert Capellani
American black-and-white films
Silent American drama films
1918 drama films
1910s American films